Muna is a 2019 action crime drama film directed by Kevin Nwankwor. The film stars Adesua Etomi in the titular role. The film was predominantly shot in both Nigeria and United States. The cast consisted of notable actors from Nollywood and Hollywood. It was released on 13 December 2019 in Nigeria, Liberia and Ghana and received positive reviews from critics while also performing well at the box office. The film was regarded as one of the most anticipated films before its release.

Cast 

 Adesua Etomi as Muna
 Adam Huss as Tony
 Massi Furlan as Adrian
 Cesar D’ La Torre as Alberto 
 Myles Cranford as Daniel
 Robert Miano as Luca
 Falz as himself (cameo appearance)
 Ebele Okaro
 Onyeka Onwenu
 Sharon Ifedi
 Michael Cavalieri as Varrick
 Jonny Williams
 Mayling Ng as Brunildaa
 Camille Winbush as Mindy
 Steve Wilder as Detective Oswald

Synopsis 
The story revolves around a spirited girl Muna raised by her grandmother; who is the last surviving member in the family. Muna's desire is to give a better life for both herself and her grandmother in the land of milk and honey leads to shady characters that will change the trajectory.

Production 
The pictures featuring Adesua Etomi-Wellington portraying the character of Muna practicing martial arts went viral on her Instagram account page in July 2017. Rapper Falz featured in a cameo appearance. The portions of the film were mostly shot in California and Los Angeles and the film shooting was concluded in March 2017. However the film release was delayed for further two years before finally being released on 13 December 2019. The official trailer of the film was unveiled on 3 June 2019.

Box office 
The film grossed 10.9 million in its first two days since its theatrical release. The film collected a total of ₦30.4million at the box office.

References

External links 

 

2019 films
2019 crime drama films
Nigerian action drama films
Nigerian crime drama films
English-language Nigerian films
Films shot in Nigeria
Films shot in the United States
2019 action drama films
2019 crime action films
2010s English-language films
American action drama films
American crime drama films
2010s American films